Desmond James Cullinane (2 August 1919 – 21 March 1990) was an Irish Gaelic footballer who played for club side Clonakilty and at inter-county level with the Cork senior football team.

Playing career

Cullinane was just 16-years-old when he made his debut with the Clonakilty senior team in 1936. It was the first of 18 successive years with the team, during which time he won seven County Championship titles during a golden age for the club. Cullinane made his first appearance for the Cork senior football team during the National League in 1938, before later captaining the county's junior team that won the Munster Championship in 1940. He returned to the senior team as captain during the opening round of the 1945 Munster Championship, however, he was later dropped from the starting fifteen and the captaincy was handed to Tadhgo Crowley. In spite of this, Cullinane won a Munster Championship title from the bench before ending the season by again lining out as a substitute when Cork claimed the All-Ireland title after a defeat of Cavan in the final.

Death

Cullinane died after a long period of ill health on 21 March 1990.

Honours

Clonakilty
Cork Senior Football Championship: 1939, 1942, 1943, 1944, 1946 (c), 1947, 1952

Cork
All-Ireland Senior Football Championship: 1945 
Munster Senior Football Championship: 1945
Munster Junior Football Championship: 1940 (c)

References

1919 births
1990 deaths
Clonakilty Gaelic footballers
Cork inter-county Gaelic footballers